is a Japanese original video animation (OVA) in the fictional Transformers universe. It was released on July 21, 1990, on VHS and on April 21, 2004, on DVD in Japan. An unofficial fan-made English dub was released on TFCog.com in March 2004.

Story
Following on from Victory, the mysterious three-faced insectoid being, Violen Jiger dispatches the "Nine Great Demon Generals"—Devastator, Menasor, Bruticus, Trypticon, Predaking, Abominus, King Poseidon, Overlord and BlackZarak—to acquire "Zone Energy", destroying the planet Feminia to obtain the world's store and in search of the powerful Zodiac. Caught in the destruction of the planet, Star Saber is rescued by Dai Atlas, who then repels an attack by the Destrons on Earth, and is appointed the new Cybertron commander at the conclusion of the episode, following a battle with the Destrons and unlocking the power of the Zodiac that was found on Earth.

Characters
The cast of Zone is composed heavily of Micromasters, who also made up much of the toyline. Dai Atlas is a "Powered Master", so named for his motorized gimmick, as is his combining partner Sonic Bomber—the toyline also featured another partner for them, Roadfire, who was not in the episode. The solitary Decepticons in the toyline were the Race Track Patrol, and Metrotitan, a redeco of the Autobot city Metroplex, neither of whom appeared in animated form. None of the Decepticon Generals ever appeared in toy form.

Cybertron (Autobots） 
Powered Masters / Big Powered:
The three Powered Masters combined into a super vehicle.
 Dai Atlas – Drill Tank / Jet / Base
 Speeder – Futuristic Car
 Sonic Bomber – Jet / Base
 Sonic – Porsche 944
 Road Fire – Tank / Base
 Drill Buster – Drill Tank

Micromasters:
The Micromasters include:

Transports
Overload
Erector
Black Heat
Deadhour
Gingham
Road Hugger
Flattop

Battle Stations
Ironworks
Hot House
Airwave

Bases
Groundshaker
Skyhopper

Others:
Victory Saber (Voiced by Hideyuki Tanaka)

Galaxy Shuttle

Destron（Decepticons） 
Nine Great Generals (九大魔将軍):
The Nine Great Generals include:
Overlord (Voiced by Keiichi Noda)
Super God General; leader of the Nine.
Devastor（Devastator）(Voiced by Hirohiko Kakegawa)
Engineering General
Menazol（Menasor ）(Voiced by Masato Hirano)
Intelligence General
Bruticus (Voiced by Yukimasa Kishino)
Fire General
Dinasaurer（Trypticon） (Voiced by Daisuke Gōri)
Dinosaur General
Predaking (Voiced by Yukimasa Kishino)
Beast General
Abominus (Voiced by Yukimasa Kishino)
Monster General
King Poseidon (Voiced by Masato Hirano)
Aquatic General
Black Zarak (Voiced by Hirohiko Kakegawa)
Dark Spirit General

Micromaster Race Track Patrol:
Barricade
F-1 Racer

Others
Organics:
Cain is a Nebulanoid boy from planet Feminia with a winged rabbit named Emusa. They meet a little boy named Akira when they come to Earth.

Violenjiger/Bio Ranger Iga:
A monstrous insectoid being who assembles the Nine Great Generals in a bid to acquire Zone Energy.

An alternate version was featured in "Ask Vector Prime" under the name Bio Ranger Iga, Lord of the Tenth Planet, and assembled a force of Thirteen "Great Demon" Generals to serve his ambitions:

Zarak Maximus, the Fusion Paranoia General, born after the Nebulan Zarak fused together the remains of several Autobots and Decepticons and was consumed by their feuding personalities.
Hydratron, the Stygian Anguish General, provided by the Quintessons.
Volcanicon, the Transwarp Pandemic General, seeking to avenge Planet Dinosaur.
Obsidian, the Radiation Mutilation General, Volcanicon's twin.
Sixshot, the Filicide Ninjitsu General, sent in place of an uninterested Shockwave.
Monstructor, the Nightmare Abyss General, offered up to Iga by the Ebon Knights.
Gigatron, the Destronger Chōkon General, who came to Iga's side from beyond time.
Ruination, the Arctic Decay General, recovered from a frozen wasteland in a Viron Cluster universe.
Toxitron, the Miasma Apostate General, given to Iga by an equivalent to Starscream who broke the components free from confinement.
Ragnarok, the Genetronic Apocalypse General, who was freed by Iga from a "dead end universe."
Puzzler, the Cybernetic Subjugation General, a cyborg gestalt permanently fused by Iga.
Shokaract, the Omega Singularity General.
Galvatronus, the Deceptigod Emperor General, who was selected by Iga as the leader of his generals.

Cast
 Yusaku Yara as Dai Atlas
 Kaneto Shiozawa as Sonic Bomber
 Eiko Yamada as Kain
 Naoko Watanabe as Akira
 Yumi Tōma as Emusa
 Hideyuki Tanaka as Victory Saber
 Ryō Horikawa as Moonradar & Detour
 Tsutomu Kashiwakura as Rabbitcrater & Whisper
 Kyōko Tongū as Hori
 Hiroyuki Satō as Sunrunner & Roadhugger
 Junko Shimakata as Micro Transformer 1
 Mayumi Seto as Micro Transformer 2
 Daisuke Gōri as Violenjiger & Dinasaurer
 Masato Hirano as King Poseidon, Menazol & Starcloud
 Yukimasa Kishino as Predaking & Abominus & Bruticus & Black Zarak
 Hirohiko Kakegawa as Devastor    
 Kei'ichi Noda as the narrator & Overlord

Theme Songs
Openings

Lyricist: Machiko Ryu / Composer: Komune Negishi / Arranger: Katsunori Ishida / Singers: Ichiro Mizuki

Endings

Lyricist: Machiko Ryu / Composer: Komune Negishi / Arranger: Katsunori Ishida / Singers: Ichiro Mizuki

Development
Originally intended to be a full TV series, Transformers: Zone was forced to become direct-to-video (OVA) due to less than expected toy sales. The series was cancelled after just one episode at 25 minutes.  It is considered the last TF Generation 1 animated movie and the last series in the Japanese Transformers Generation 1 saga.

Adaptations
The missing characters did go on to appear in the pages of the Japanese publication, TV Magazine otherwise known as Telemaga. This monthly magazine had always included Transformers manga story pages and splash illustrations with explanatory text. No direct manga was ever released for Zone. TV Magazine did publish a retelling on the OVA in manga format in its April 1990 issue.

These story pages were used to provide supporting fiction for the remaining two years' worth of toylines—1991's Battlestars: Return of Convoy and 1992's Operation: Combination.

External links

1990 anime OVAs
Mecha anime and manga
Television pilots not picked up as a series
Television shows set in Japan
Toei Animation original video animation
Zone